Hana Hegerová (20 October 1931 – 23 March 2021) was a Slovak singer and actress. Often referred to as the Queen of Czechoslovak chanson, she gained popularity primarily as a singer of chansons. Outside of her homebase, Hegerová has attained a recognition especially in German-speaking countries. She lived in Prague, Czech Republic.

Biography
Born Carmen Mária Štefánia Farkašová, her father, Ján Farkaš, was a bank clerk of Jewish descent. From the mother's side she comes from an old and important lower aristocratic family - a very old gentry family Čelko from the village Čelkova Lehota, which is located in northwestern Slovakia, in the district of Považská Bystrica. From 1937 to 1942 Hegerová attended ballet school at the National Theater in Bratislava.  After completing her primary education in Komárno in 1950, she worked as a clerk for Škoda Works and as a teacher at a vocational school.  From 1951 to 1953, Hegerová attended professional theatrical courses at the State Theater Conservatory, then in 1957 joined the company of the Peter Jilemnický Theatre in Žilina.

In 1954, Hegerová played the title role in the film Frona under the name Hana Čelková. 1957 saw her first appearance as a singer in Tatra Revue in Bratislava. From 1958 to 1961, she performed at the Rokoko Theatre in Prague, and from 1961 to 1966 at the Semafor Theater where she appeared in the jazz opera Dobře placená procházka by Jiří Suchý (libretto) and Jiří Šlitr (music), and film Kdyby tisíc klarinetů (If a Thousand Clarinets). Hegerová's repertoire included many chansons by Czech and Slovak authors, and also Czech versions of songs from the repertoire of Édith Piaf ("Mylord"), Jacques Brel ("Ne me quitte pas"), and songs by Kurt Weill ("Surabaya Johnny", "The Barbara Song") and many others. In 1967, Hana Hegerová appeared at the Paris Olympia with the songs of Jacques Brel and Charles Aznavour. She also performed at the World's Fair in Montreal. From 1977 to 1981, during the Czechoslovak normalization, Hegerová was forced to stop her activities abroad, and her concert activities were also restricted in Czechoslovakia. Following the Velvet Revolution she began to perform more often in public. During this time she received many music awards, for example, the Platinum Disc in 1992 and the Czech Gramy in 1996.

In 2002, Hana Heregová received a Medal of Merit from Czech President Václav Havel. In 2014, she received Order of Tomáš Garrigue Masaryk from President Miloš Zeman.

In August 2011, the national press announced that the diva decided to retire from the music industry, saying for MusicServer: "I have decided that I no longer want it. I don't want to sing, I don't want to go public. I want to get rid of stress. Simply, Hana Hegerová enterprise is terminated, only Hana Hegerová remains as a private person who finally wants to enjoy peaceful days with her dog. Wish me luck so that there are still lots of them left."

In December 2014, she was hospitalized with serious heart problems in the General University Hospital (Všeobecná fakultní nemocnice) in Prague.

Hana Hegerová died on 23 March 2021, aged 89 years, at Prague hospital , after complications from hip fracture.

Discography

Studio albums
 1966: Šansony s Hanou Hegerovou
 1971: Recital
 1973: Recital 2
 1977: Lásko prokletá
 1987: Potměšilý host
 2010: Mlýnské kolo v srdci mém

Export albums
 1967: Ich (aka Chansons)
 1969: Hana Hegerová
 1972: So geht es auf der Welt zu
 1974: Fast ein Liebeslied
 1975: Wir für euch
 1987: Chansons (aka Wenn die Schatten)

Filmography

Awards

Major awards

Notes
 A  "Szeptem" composed by Jerzy Abratowski for lyrics by Jacek Korczakowski, and the Gold award won by "Jesienna rozłąka" sung by Anita Traversi from Switzerland.
 B  Hegerová shared the Bronze award along with Emil Dimitrov who entered the contest with "Arlekino". The Gold went to Greek Jeanne Yovanna for "Ti Krima", while Silver won by "Stav" by Ester Reichstadt from Israel.
 C  The award for the Female Singer of the Year went to Lucie Bílá, while the second nominee was Lucie Vondráčková.
 D  The category of the Album of the Year won by Tepláky aneb Kroky Františka Soukupa set by Nightwork band. Outlet People by Toxique group featured the rest of nominated works.
 E  According to the municipal authorities, Prague 1 awards the Honorary citizenship title only exceptionally. As such, Hegerová became the first female ever and the fifth honoree in total, respectively (following writer Josef Topol, photographer Ladislav Sitenský, conductor Jaroslav Hrnčíř and architect Josef Hyzler).

Music polls

Notes
 F  The initial two editions of the Zlatý slavík poll included only one category for both, either male or female vocalists. Else in 1962, Hegerová would be ranked as the third most popular female singer, following Yvetta Simonová and Eva Pilarová.
 G  In 1963, Hegerová entered the poll as the second most voted female vocalist in the country, following Pilarová.

See also
 Hana a jej bratia (Slovak film, featuring music by Hegerová, from 2000)
 Strážce plamene ("Kdo by se díval nazpátek")
 Strážce plamene v obrazech ("Kdo by se díval nazpátek")
 Honorific nicknames in popular music

References

Sources

External links

 Hana Hegerová (Fansite)
 
 
 Hana Hegerová at CDmusic.cz
 Hana Hegerová on Discogs
 Hana Hegerová at EuroPopMusic
 
 
 

1931 births
2021 deaths
Musicians from Bratislava
Slovak film actresses
Slovak people of Jewish descent
Recipients of the Order of Tomáš Garrigue Masaryk, 1st class
Recipients of Medal of Merit (Czech Republic)
Commanders of the Ordre national du Mérite
20th-century Slovak actresses
21st-century Slovak actresses
Actors from Bratislava
20th-century Slovak women singers
21st-century Slovak women singers
Czechoslovak women singers
Chevaliers of the Ordre des Arts et des Lettres